The Lincoln-Page PT was an American open-cockpit two-seat single-bay biplane trainer aircraft produced from 1929 to 1931.

Manufacture and operations

Lincoln-Page were eager to take a share of the emerging trainer market. Using their Lincoln-Page LP-3 as a basis they set about designing the PT. The resultant aircraft was quite different from the LP-3, having tandem cockpits and a lengthened rear fuselage. The design bears a resemblance to the Swallow aircraft, partially from manager Victor Roos prior history with the company. Structure was standard for its day:- welded steel tube warren girder fuselage with spruce spars and basswood ribs for the wings. With the ubiquitous Curtiss OX-5 the PT proved quite versatile and able to perform basic aerobatic manoeuvers without too much effort. It was awarded ATC no 181 in July 1929.

The aircraft was also offered with a Curtiss OXX-6  engine, but no evidence exists that any were produced. However, a later variant using a Kinner K-5 radial engine was named Lincoln PT-K.

Surviving aircraft
A PT-K is on display at the EAA AirVenture Museum. In August 2014 three other PTs were registered by the Federal Aviation Administration as owned by private pilot owners in the United States.

Variants
PT (ATC 181)
 Curtiss OX-5 or  Curtiss OXX-6 V-8 engine. 28 built.
PT-K (ATC 279)
 Kinner K-5 radial engine. 18 built
PT-W (ATC 284)
 Warner Scarab radial engine. 5 built
PT-T (ATC 344)
 Brownback Tiger. 5 built

Specifications

See also

References

Notes

Citations

Bibliography

External links
 

1920s United States civil trainer aircraft